Boisea rubrolineata or the western boxelder bug is identical to the boxelder bug aside from having prominent red veins on its corium. It is found in western North America. Adults are 9-13 mm in length. The thorax and wings are black with red lines, and the abdomen is red. Nymphs are bright red and gray. Both nymphs and adults feed on boxelder. In fall and winter, adults might be noted migrating indoors to hibernate.

References

Insects of North America
Insects described in 1956
Serinethinae